Bomiriya Central/National College is a public college located in Kaduwela, a suburb of Colombo city in Western Province, Sri Lanka.

Bomiriya Central College today
A plot of land that had belonged to the principal was allocated for the school grounds. The school enrolls over 3,500 students and over 200 teachers. The school covers grades 6 to 13. Each grade has ten parallel sections.

Donation of the land 
The history of Bomiriya School dates back to the end of the 19th century. Bomiriya Salgahamula Road, which was started with a thatched roof on a land owned by Mr. Lewis Gunasekera, marks the beginning of Bomiriya Vidyalaya. The construction of a permanent school building on an acre of land owned by Hendrik Gunasekera between 1898 and 1902 was the basis for stabilizing the college.

History
The new school was called Bomiriya Bilingual School and its first principal was Don Simon Goonetileke. Between 1917 and 1918, due to insufficient space, HD A donation has been made to the government for the construction of a new school on a land owned by Mr. Dawson Gunasekera. Around 1919, a separate bilingual school for boys was started on the site of the present Bomiriya Maha Vidyalaya. Saram Wijemanne and Silva served as the first teachers during the period 1919 - 1937 and in 1937 GPM. Mr. Jayasena has been appointed as the first teacher. Until 1948, education was provided in Sinhala and English medium up to the Junior Certificate Examination. Senior school classes started in 1948 in two languages and in 1956 the medium of instruction was Sinhala.

In 1963, A.M.K. At the request of Mr. Dhanasekra, the GCE Commerce Division 1964 University Admission GCE An A / L Arts section was started. By 1973, N.S. Under the guidance of Mr. Perera, the Commerce Division of the college was formally established in a separate building and the Advanced Level Science Division was established in 1989. N.S. Mr. Perera has been the Principal of the college for nearly 30 years and has done a great service for the betterment of the college. He was later promoted to the post of principal of the college. Wijesinghe MBM Tennakoon and Sunil Perera. The principal of the college who took over the leadership of the college in the year 2005 was U.D.I.C. Mr. de Silva led the college towards a golden age and served till 24.05.2017. The Deputy Principal Mr. WARA Peiris served as the Acting Principal from 25.05.2017 to 23.07.2017. Mrs. RAHS Ranwala, who has been the Senior Deputy Principal since 24.07.2017, went down in history as the first woman to hold the post of Principal of Bomiriya National School, leading the school mother.

2013 GCE The launch of the (Advanced Level) Technology stream marked another special page for our school.
Under the 13 Year Continuing Education Project in the year 2017 GCE (Advanced Level) “Vocational Education” Division was started as a new stream.

KK has been appointed as the current Principal from 24/01/2018. Under the leadership of Mrs. Wijeyeratne Vidumatha, the school is now committed to transforming the school into a leading school in the Jayewardenepura Zone.

Houses
 - Meththa (මෙත්තා)
 - Karuna (කරුණා)
 - Muditha (මුදිතා)
 - Upekkha (උපේක්ඛා)

Sports
The annual big match, the Battle of Blues, between Subharathi Vidyalaya and Bomiriya National School is the major sport event in the school.

References

1902 establishments in Ceylon
Educational institutions established in 1902
National schools in Sri Lanka
Schools in Colombo District
Schools in Colombo